Ramnagar is one of the 60 Legislative Assembly constituencies of Tripura state in India. It is in West Tripura district and is a part of Tripura West (Lok Sabha constituency).

Members of Legislative Assembly 
 1977: Biren Datta, Communist Party of India (Marxist)
 1983: Biren Datta, Communist Party of India (Marxist)
 1988: Surajit Datta, Indian National Congress
 1993: Surajit Datta, Indian National Congress
 1998: Surajit Datta, Indian National Congress
 2003: Surajit Datta, Indian National Congress
 2008: Surajit Datta, Indian National Congress
 2013: Ratan Das, Communist Party of India (Marxist)

Election results

2023 elections

2018 election

2013 election

See also
List of constituencies of the Tripura Legislative Assembly
West Tripura district

Notes

References

West Tripura district
Assembly constituencies of Tripura